S Tapajó (S-33)  was the fourth boat of the  of the Brazilian Navy.

Construction and career
The boat was built at Arsenal de Marinha do Rio de Janeiro in Rio de Janeiro and was launched on 5 June 1998 and commissioned on 21 December 1999.

Gallery

References

External links

Ships built in Brazil
Tupi-class submarines
1998 ships